Marta Batinović (born 20 April 1990) is a Croatian-born Montenegrin female handball player who plays as a goalkeeper for SCM Gloria Buzău and the Montenegrin national team.

International honours
EHF Champions League:
Winner: 2015
Finalist: 2014
Fourth place: 2016, 2017

Individual awards 
Croatian Player of the Year: 2015

References

External links

1990 births
Living people
Croatian female handball players
Montenegrin female handball players
Montenegrin people of Croatian descent
Sportspeople from Metković
Expatriate handball players
Croatian expatriate sportspeople in Romania
Montenegrin expatriate sportspeople in Romania
SCM Râmnicu Vâlcea (handball) players
RK Podravka Koprivnica players
Mediterranean Games competitors for Croatia
Competitors at the 2009 Mediterranean Games